The Leavitt–Hovey House is an historic house located at 402 Main Street in Greenfield, Massachusetts.  Built in 1797, it is a prominent work of local architect Asher Benjamin, and a good local example of Federal period architecture.  Since 1909 it has served as the home of the Greenfield Public Library.  It was listed on the National Register of Historic Places in 1983,  and was included in the Main Street Historic District in 1988.

Description
The Leavitt–Hovey House stands in downtown Greenfield, on the north side of Main Street east of the main business district and opposite Hope Street.  It is a two-story wood-frame structure, with numerous additions to its sides and rear.  The main block is topped by a hip roof, with two interior chimneys.  Its exterior is finished in wooden clapboards.  The front facade is five bays wide, with a center entrance sheltered by a gabled porch supported by clustered columns.  Front-gabled wings are attached to each side at a recess, with similar styling.

History
The house was designed architect Asher Benjamin in 1797 for Judge Jonathan Leavitt.  Leavitt was a graduate of Yale College. He began his career as an attorney in Greenfield. He later served as Judge of the Court of Common Pleas in 1812, and Judge of Probate from 1814 to 1821, as well as the first president of the Franklin Bank of Greenfield. He used the west wing of this house as an office for his business activities. Judge Leavitt married the daughter of Yale President Ezra Stiles.

Some original architectural elements of the Leavitt–Hovey House are in the collection of Historic Deerfield in Deerfield, where they may be seen by appointment.

The town of Greenfield took the home by eminent domain in 1907, and in 1909 opened the Greenfield Public Library in the building.

See also
National Register of Historic Places listings in Franklin County, Massachusetts

References

Houses completed in 1897
Asher Benjamin buildings
Houses on the National Register of Historic Places in Massachusetts
 
Libraries in Massachusetts
Houses in Franklin County, Massachusetts
Libraries in Franklin County, Massachusetts
Greenfield, Massachusetts
National Register of Historic Places in Franklin County, Massachusetts
Historic district contributing properties in Massachusetts